Arocatus longiceps, the plane tree bug, is a species of seed bug in the family Lygaeidae, found mainly in Europe.

Subspecies
These five subspecies belong to the species Arocatus longiceps:
 Arocatus longiceps fuscipes Picco, 1920
 Arocatus longiceps longiceps Stal, 1872
 Arocatus longiceps nigrirostris Picco, 1920
 Arocatus longiceps sanguineus Picco, 1920
 Arocatus longiceps thoracicus Picco, 1920

References

External links

 

Lygaeidae
Hemiptera of Europe
Insects described in 1872